The Picture of Dorian Gray (1910), also known as Dorian Grays Portræt, is a Danish silent film based on the 1890 novel The Picture of Dorian Gray by Oscar Wilde.

See also
Adaptations of The Picture of Dorian Gray

External links

The Picture of Dorian Gray at SilentEra

References

1910 films
Films based on The Picture of Dorian Gray
Danish silent films
Danish black-and-white films